Kara-Suu Lake is a rock-dammed lake in Toktogul District of Jalal-Abad Province of Kyrgyzstan. It is located at the altitude of 2022 m in riverbed of Kara-Suu, right tributary of Naryn River.

References 

Lakes of Kyrgyzstan
Mountain lakes
Tian Shan